The 2019 Sydney to Hobart Yacht Race was the 75th annual running of the Sydney to Hobart Yacht Race. Hosted by the Cruising Yacht Club of Australia sponsored by Rolex, it began on Sydney Harbour at 13:00 on 26 December 2019, before heading south for  via the Tasman Sea, Bass Strait, Storm Bay and up the River Derwent, to cross the finish line in Hobart, Tasmania.

A fleet of 157 boats contested the race and 154 finished. Line honours were claimed by LDV Comanche in a time of 1 day, 18 hours, 30 minutes and 24 seconds. Ichi Ban (Matt Allen) won her second Tattersall Cup.

Results

Line honours (Top 10)

Handicap results (Top 10)

References 

Sydney to Hobart Yacht Race
Sydney
Sydney
December 2019 sports events in Australia